Safa'i may refer to:
 Safa'i, Iran
 Safa'i, Samoa